The Long Hello is a studio instrumental album by David Jackson, Hugh Banton, Guy Evans and Nic Potter recorded in August 1973 and released in Italy in 1974 (and Britain and Europe in 1976). All had been members of Van der Graaf Generator, but the band had split up in August 1972 (reformed in 1975).

In 1981 Potter and Evans released a follow-up to this album, The Long Hello Volume Two. There also is a Long Hello Volume Three (by Jackson and Evans, 1982) and Long Hello Volume Four (by Jackson, Evans and Life of Riley, 1983). The album Gentlemen Prefer Blues (by Jackson, Banton and Evans, 1985) is sometimes regarded as a sort of "Long Hello Volume Five."

It was engineered by Banton and was mixed at the Chalk Farm Studio, Chalk Farm, London.

Track listing
"The Theme from (Plunge)" (David Jackson) – 5:31
"The O Flat Session" (Pietro Messina) – 5:32
"Morris to Cape Roth" (David Jackson) – 6:33
"Brain Seizure" (Hugh Banton) – 4:01
"Fairhazel Gardens" (David Jackson, Pietro Messina) – 7:56
"Looking at You" (David Jackson) – 6:16
"I've Lost My Cat" (David Jackson) – 8:28

Personnel
 David Jackson – saxophones, flute, piano
 Hugh Banton – all instruments on "Brain Seizure", bass on "The O Flat Session"
 Guy Evans – drums
 Nic Potter – bass
 Ced Curtis – electric guitar, bass on "Fairhazel Gardens"
 Pietro Messina – electric guitar, acoustic guitar, piano

Release history

References

External links
 
 
 
 

1974 debut albums
Progressive rock albums by British artists
United Artists Records albums